Corrado Mancioli (26 March 1904 – 20 September 1968) was an Italian painter. His work was part of the art competitions at the 1936 Summer Olympics and the 1948 Summer Olympics.

References

1904 births
1968 deaths
20th-century Italian painters
Italian male painters
Olympic competitors in art competitions
Painters from Rome
20th-century Italian male artists